Pandharpur Assembly constituency (252) is one of the 288 Vidhan Sabha (legislative assembly) constituencies of Maharashtra state, western India. This constituency is located in Solapur district. It is a segment of Solapur (Lok Sabha constituency).

Two families, Paricharak and Bhalke, have been prominent in local politics since last 3-4 decades. Sudhakar Paricharak was elected five times, from 1985 to 2004. In 2009, NCP fielded Vijaysinh Mohite Patil but he lost to Bharat Bhalke. Then in 2014, Bhalake, by now in Congress, defeated Shailendra Paricharak. In 2019, Bhalke defeated Sudhakar Paricharak who had contested as BJP candidate. In August 2020, Sudhakar Paricharak died during Corona epidemic at the age of 84. In November 2020, sitting MLA Bhalke also died after contracting the novel coronavirus at the age of 60.

Geographical scope
The constituency comprises Mangalvedha taluka, revenue circles Kasegaon and Pandharpur of Pandharpur taluka and Pandharpur Municipal Council.

Members of Legislative Assembly

Election Results

2021 Bypoll

2019 result

2014 result

2009 result

1962 Vidhan Sabha Elections
 Audumber Kondiba Patil (INC) : 28,246 votes   
 Jayawant Ghanashyam More (IND) : 13275

Notes

References

Assembly constituencies of Solapur district
Assembly constituencies of Maharashtra